Deep Waters is a lost 1920 American silent drama film directed by Maurice Tourneur and written by F. Hopkinson Smith, Michael Morton and John Gilbert. The film stars Rudolph Christians, Barbara Bedford, John Gilbert, Florence Deshon, Jack McDonald, Henry Woodward, and George Nichols. The film was released on October 10, 1920, by Paramount Pictures.

Cast
Rudolph Christians as Caleb West 
Barbara Bedford as Betty West
John Gilbert as Bill Lacey 
Florence Deshon as Kate Leroy
Jack McDonald as Morgan Leroy
Henry Woodward as Henry Sanford
George Nichols as Captain Joe Bell
Lydia Yeamans Titus as Aunty Bell
Marie Van Tassell as Barzella Busteed
James Gibson as Squealer	
Ruth Wing as Zuby Higgins
B. Edgar Stockwell as Seth Wingate
Charles Millsfield as Professor Page
Siggrid McDonald as Page's Niece

References

External links 

 

1920 films
1920s English-language films
Silent American drama films
1920 drama films
Paramount Pictures films
Films directed by Maurice Tourneur
American black-and-white films
American silent feature films
Lost American films
Films with underwater settings
Films based on American novels
1920 lost films
Lost drama films
1920s American films
Silent adventure films